Roland Walter Schmitt (July 24, 1923 – March 31, 2017 ) was an American physicist, business executive and the sixteenth president of Rensselaer Polytechnic Institute.

He was born on July 24, 1923, in Seguin, Texas to Walter L. Schmitt and Myrtle F. (Caldwell) Schmitt. On June 2, 1951, he married Alice V. Calhoun (b. February 12, 1930) and they had two sons: Lorenz (b. 1952) and Brian (b. 1954). Alice died on July 17, 1956. He later married Claire F. Kunz (b. July 11, 1928 d. July 11, 2017) on September 19, 1957; they had two children: Alice (b. 1958) and Henry (b. 1961).

He graduated from the University of Texas with a B.S. in physics and a B.A. in mathematics, both in 1947 and a master's degree in physics in 1948. He received a P.h.D. in physics from Rice University in 1951. He then joined General Electric as a research associate and remained with the company until his retirement in 1988. From 1978 to 1986, he directed the General Electric Research and Development Center in Schenectady, New York. In 1982, he was appointed senior vice president.

From 1988 to 1993, he was president of Rensselaer Polytechnic Institute. During his tenure, he oversaw a $200 million fundraising campaign and saw the addition of new degree programs and research centers. He served as a member of the National Science Board from 1982 to 1994, and as chairman from 1984 to 1988. In January 2000, he was appointed by New York State Governor George Pataki as chairman of the board of the New York State Office Of Science, Technology and Academic Research. In 1978, he was elected to the National Academy of Engineering and received the Arthur M. Bueche Award from the NAE in 1995. He was a member of the Institute of Electrical and Electronics Engineers, the 1989 recipient of the IEEE Engineering Leadership Recognition Award, the 1988 recipient of the Maurice Holland Award and 1989 recipient of the IRI Medal, both from the Industrial Research Institute, and the 1992 recipient of the IEEE Founders Medal. He was a fellow of the American Academy of Arts and Sciences, the American Physical Society and the American Association for the Advancement of Science. From 1993 to 1998 Schmitt was the Chair of the Governing Board of the American Institute of Physics. 

Schmitt died in March 2017, aged 93.

References

External links
 

1923 births
2017 deaths
University of Texas at Austin College of Natural Sciences alumni
Rice University alumni
Rensselaer Polytechnic Institute faculty
Presidents of Rensselaer Polytechnic Institute
People from Seguin, Texas
Members of the United States National Academy of Engineering
Fellows of the American Academy of Arts and Sciences